Life Begins at 40 is a 1935 black-and-white film starring Will Rogers and Richard Cromwell. It is based on the non-fiction self-help book Life Begins at Forty by Walter B. Pitkin.

Plot
Kenesaw H.Clark is a small town newspaper editor and publisher. He is operating on a shoestring budget and sometimes accepts livestock in lieu of cash.

When Clark hires an ex-convict to work on th e paper, pompous town banker Colonel Abercrombie raises the roof. Cromwell had been jailed for a theft from his bank when he worked there as a teller. Clark has doubts about Cromwell's guilt and refuses to fire him. Abercrombie takes revenge by calling in his loans on the newspaper.
Clark does his best to carry on, even printing the day's news on butcher paper.

Clark responds not with anger, but with humor. He hires a group of professional hog callers to disrupt a political speech by the Colonel. These individuals do their job a little too well, as a stampede of hogs answers the call and destroy the speaker's platform.

The actual thief from years ago was the Colonel's neer-do-well son Joe, who has long since lost the original
money at the racetrack. One night, the Colonel surprises someone trying to crack his office safe. He shoots and wounds the intruder, not recognizing him as his son. The Colonel leads a lynch mob against the ex-convict, and Clark has to fend them off single-handed. A policeman finally informs the Colonel that his son is in the hospital and has made a full confession.

Clark had figured out some time ago that the Colonel's son was the  thief, but couldn't figure out how to gently break it to him.

Cast
Will Rogers as Kenesaw H. Clark
Richard Cromwell as Lee Austin
George Barbier as Col. Joseph Abercrombie
Rochelle Hudson as Adele Anderson
Jane Darwell as Ida Harris
Slim Summerville as T. Watterson Meriwether
Sterling Holloway as Chris
Thomas Beck as Joe Abercrombie
Roger Imhof as Pappy Smithers
Charles Sellon as Tom Cotton
John Bradford as Wally Stevens
Ruth Gillette as Mrs. Cotton
Hank Bell as Townsman (uncredited) 
Creighton Hale as Drug Clerk (uncredited)

External links

1935 films
1935 comedy films
American black-and-white films
Films based on non-fiction books
Films directed by George Marshall
American comedy films
Films with screenplays by Lamar Trotti
Fox Film films
1930s English-language films
1930s American films
English-language comedy films